John Bromwich and Frank Sedgman were the defending champions, but lost in the quarterfinals to Budge Patty and Eric Sturgess.

Pancho Gonzales and Frank Parker defeated Gardnar Mulloy and Ted Schroeder in the final, 6–4, 6–4, 6–2 to win the gentlemen's doubles tennis title at the 1949 Wimbledon Championship.

Seeds

  Gardnar Mulloy /  Ted Schroeder (final)
  John Bromwich /  Frank Sedgman (quarterfinals)
  Pancho Gonzales /  Frank Parker (champions)
  Jaroslav Drobný /  Bob Falkenburg (quarterfinals)

Draw

Finals

Top half

Section 1

Section 2

Bottom half

Section 3

Section 4

References

External links

Men's Doubles
Wimbledon Championship by year – Men's doubles